White cedar may refer to several different trees:

 Bignoniaceae
 Tabebuia heterophylla - native to Caribbean islands and also cultivated as an ornamental tree
 Cupressaceae:
 Chamaecyparis thyoides – Atlantic white cypress
 Cupressus lusitanica – Mexican white cedar
 Thuja occidentalis – Eastern arborvitae
 Meliaceae:
 Melia azedarach – Chinaberry, commonly referred to as white cedar in Australia